Joseph Ladd Neal (1867–?) was an American architect who designed Richardsonian Romanesque, Shingle Style and Colonial Revival buildings.

Born in Wiscasset, Maine, the son of a hardware merchant, he apprenticed under Boston, Massachusetts architect Charles Howard Walker. He worked for Shepley, Rutan & Coolidge in Boston and James Renwick, Jr. in New York City, before settling in Pittsburgh, Pennsylvania about 1892. In 1893 he established a partnership with S. Alfred Hopkins, that lasted a year. A partnership with George M. Rowland lasted from 1902 to 1906.

Four of his works – Lithgow Public Library, Merrill Memorial Library, College Hill Station, Small Point Club – are listed on the National Register of Historic Places.

Selected works
Lithgow Library and Reading Room, Augusta, Maine, 1894–96, with S. Alfred Hopkins. Neal & Hopkins won the commission in a national design competition with 65 submissions.
First Unitarian Church, Pittsburgh, Pennsylvania, c. 1895.
Small Point Club, Small Point, Maine, 1895-97.
Morrill Memorial Library, Norwood, Massachusetts, 1897-98. A near-replica of Neal's Lithgow Library.
Alterations to Beaver County Courthouse, Beaver, Pennsylvania, 1901.
James Lyall Stuart house, Sewickley, Pennsylvania, c. 1905, with George M. Rowland.
College Hill Station (Pittsburgh & Lake Erie Railroad), Geneva College, Beaver Falls, Pennsylvania, 1910, John Abiel Atwood, engineer.

References

Architects from Maine
1867 births
Year of death missing
People from Wiscasset, Maine